Nikolett Krausz (born 20 May 1981 in Budapest) is a Hungarian former artistic gymnast. She competed at the 1995 World Championships and the 1996 Summer Olympics.

References

1981 births
Living people
Hungarian female artistic gymnasts
Gymnasts at the 1996 Summer Olympics
Olympic gymnasts of Hungary
Gymnasts from Budapest